Druid Hills Historic District is a national historic district located at Hendersonville, Henderson County, North Carolina.  The district encompasses 76 contributing buildings in a predominantly residential section of Hendersonville developed between 1910 and 1945. It includes notable examples of Tudor Revival and Bungalow / American Craftsman residential architecture.  The planned community was designed by noted landscape architect Earle Sumner Draper.

It was listed on the National Register of Historic Places in 2000.

References

Houses on the National Register of Historic Places in North Carolina
Historic districts on the National Register of Historic Places in North Carolina
Tudor Revival architecture in North Carolina
Houses in Henderson County, North Carolina
National Register of Historic Places in Henderson County, North Carolina
Hendersonville, North Carolina